Mars 2MV-4 can refer to two Soviet spacecraft:
 Mars 2MV-4 No.1
 Mars 1

See also
 Mars 2M (disambiguation)